Steven Vandeput (born 30 March 1967 in Hasselt) is a Belgian politician and is affiliated to the N-VA. He was elected as a member of the Belgian Chamber of Representatives in 2010.

In October 2014 he became the Minister of Defence in the Michel Government. He was succeeded by Sander Loones on 12 November 2018 since Vandeput will become the next mayor of Hasselt on 1 January 2019.

Notes

1967 births
Living people
Members of the Chamber of Representatives (Belgium)
New Flemish Alliance politicians
People from Hasselt
Belgian Ministers of Defence
21st-century Belgian politicians
Mayors of places in Belgium